Bakerstown is a census-designated place within Richland Township in Allegheny County, Pennsylvania, United States. As of the 2020 census, it had a population of 2,745. Despite Bakerstown's small size, there are a few shops located within the settlement. The Bakerstown Hotel "Home of the Tony Bagel" is now closed, Mr. C's Pizzeria is also closed, Tom Henry Chevrolet, Olives and Peppers, and Nails By Debbie are some of the shops that make their home in Bakerstown. More amenities are offered in nearby Gibsonia, PA. Bakerstown is also home to the Richland Township Community Park.

Demographics

Education
Bakerstown is located in Pine-Richland School District near the border of Deer Lakes School District. Students K-3 in Bakerstown go to Richland Elementary, students 4-6 go to Eden Hall Upper Elementary, students 7-8 go to Pine-Richland Middle School, and students 9-12 attend Pine-Richland High School.

Notable person
 Lizzie M. Guthrie (1838-1880), missionary

References

Census-designated places in Allegheny County, Pennsylvania
Census-designated places in Pennsylvania